Marián Zeman (born 7 July 1974) is a Slovak former footballer who played at both professional and international levels as a central defender. Active at club level in Slovakia, Turkey, the Netherlands, Switzerland, Greece and Portugal, Zeman made over 200 career league appearances.

Post-retirement Zeman features as a expert analyst and co-commentator for public broadcaster RTVS in their national team broadcasts and major tournaments such as UEFA Euro 2020.

Career
Born in Bratislava, Zeman played professionally for Slovan Bratislava, İstanbulspor, Vitesse Arnhem, Grasshopper, PAOK and Beira-Mar.

He also earned 27 caps for the Slovak national side between 1994 and 2003, including five FIFA World Cup qualifying matches.

References 

1974 births
Living people
Slovak footballers
Slovak football managers
Slovakia international footballers
PAOK FC players
ŠK Slovan Bratislava players
S.C. Beira-Mar players
Grasshopper Club Zürich players
İstanbulspor footballers
SBV Vitesse players
Slovak Super Liga players
Primeira Liga players
Eredivisie players
Super League Greece players
Swiss Super League players
Süper Lig players
Slovak expatriate footballers
Expatriate footballers in Portugal
Slovak expatriate sportspeople in Portugal
Expatriate footballers in Turkey
Slovak expatriate sportspeople in Turkey
Expatriate footballers in Greece
Slovak expatriate sportspeople in Greece
Slovak expatriate sportspeople in Switzerland
Expatriate footballers in Switzerland
Expatriate footballers in the Netherlands
Slovak expatriate sportspeople in the Netherlands
Footballers from Bratislava
Association football defenders
Slovak television people